William Nicholas Pax Cosgrove (11 November 1918 – 11 August 1943) was an Australian rules footballer who played with Richmond in the Victorian Football League (VFL). He served in the RAAF during World War II, and was killed in action in 1943 when his plane crashed.

Family
The son of John Nereus Cosgrove (1867-1925), and Madelaine Mary Stephanie Cosgrove (1884-1933), née Tracey, William Nicholas Pax Cosgrove was born on 11 November 1918, Armistice Day—he was named "Pax" (Latin for peace) in recognition of that fact. He married Dorothy May McLean (1920-) in 1940.<ref>New Tiger Married, The (Melbourne) Herald, (Friday, 26 April 1940), p.15.</ref>

Cosgrove's nephew, Peter Cosgrove, became Chief of the Defence Force and Governor-General of Australia.

Football
He was a "talented and courageous" centre half-back, recruited by Richmond in 1939, who played in three senior games for Richmond in 1940, and played in 34 games for Richmond's Second XVIII over the period 1939–1942.

Showing his loyalty to his VFL team, he decorated his RAAF planes with the Richmond logo and the slogan "Eat 'em alive".

Richmond's award for its best first year player is now known as the Bill Cosgrove/Harry Jenkins Trophy, in honour of both Cosgrove and the Tasmanian-based Richmond talent scout Harry Jenkins.

Military service
He was killed in action on 11 August 1943. While flying between Vivigani and Bola in the Territory of New Guinea, Flight Sergeant Cosgrove's plane crashed into the Solomon Sea off Goodenough Island, killing him and Flight Sergeant Bernard Le Griffon.

See also
 List of Victorian Football League players who died in active service

Footnotes

References
 Hogan P: The Tigers of Old'', Richmond FC, (Melbourne), 1996. 
 Holmesby, Russell & Main, Jim (2007). The Encyclopedia of AFL Footballers. 7th ed. Melbourne: Bas Publishing.
 Cosgrove's Cobbers, The Sporting Globe, (Saturday, 23 October 1943), p.5.
 World War Two Nominal Roll: Flight Sergeant William Nicholas Pax Cosgrove (400140).
 World War Two Service Record: Flight Sergeant William Nicholas Pax Cosgrove (400140), National Archives of Australia.
 World War Two Service (Repatriation) Record: Flight Sergeant William Nicholas Pax Cosgrove (400140), National Archives of Australia.
 Roll of Honour: Flight Sergeant William Nicholas Pax Cosgrove (400140), Australian War Memorial.

External links

 

1918 births
1943 deaths
Australian rules footballers from Victoria (Australia)
Richmond Football Club players
Australian military personnel killed in World War II
Royal Australian Air Force personnel of World War II
People educated at Xavier College
Old Xaverians Football Club players
Royal Australian Air Force airmen